Guerreros de Morelia was a team in Morelia, Michoacán, Mexico playing in the Liga Nacional de Baloncesto Profesional (LNBP). Their home arena was Gimnasio Michoacana.

Basketball teams in Mexico
Sports teams in Michoacán
Morelia